Ruadhri Ua Flaithbertaigh was King of Iar Connacht.

Biography

Ruaidhri may have succeeded by killing his brother, Conchubhar; the Annals of Ulster, sub anno 1186, record that "Conchubhar Ua Flaithbertaigh was killed by Ruaidhri Ua Flaithbertaigh, by his own brother, in Ara."

Ruadhri was taken prisoner by King Cathal Crobhdearg Ua Conchobair of Connaught in unknown circumstances in 1197. There is no further record of him.

See also

 Ó Flaithbertaigh

References
 
 West or H-Iar Connaught Ruaidhrí Ó Flaithbheartaigh, 1684 (published 1846, ed. James Hardiman).
 
 Origin of the Surname O'Flaherty, Anthony Matthews, Dublin, 1968, p. 40.

People from County Galway
1197 deaths
Ruadhri
12th-century Irish monarchs
Year of birth unknown